Caravanserai of Agha Gahraman Mirsiyab is an 18th-century Azerbaijani caravanserai located in Shusha, Azerbaijan.

References

Caravanserais in Azerbaijan
Commercial buildings completed in the 18th century
Islamic architecture
Architecture in Azerbaijan
Tourist attractions in Azerbaijan